Alexei Mastryukov (born September 15, 1992) is a Russian professional ice hockey player. He is currently playing with HC Lada Togliatti of the Supreme Hockey League (VHL).

Mastryukov made his Kontinental Hockey League debut playing with HC Lada Togliatti during the 2014–15 KHL season.

References

External links

1992 births
Living people
HC Lada Togliatti players
Russian ice hockey forwards